Crossley's vanga (Mystacornis crossleyi), also known as Crossley's babbler-vanga, Crossley's babbler, Madagascar groundhunter, or Madagascar groundjumper, is a bird species in the family Vangidae.

Taxonomy
The bird is in the monotypic genus Mystacornis. The species is an example of convergent evolution: its bill and body shape adapted to its habit of looking for insect prey in the leaf litter, eventually becoming so similar to that of ground-babblers that early naturalists initially classified the Crossley's vanga into what was then known as the babbler family, Timaliidae.

Description

Crossley's vanga is a small babbler-like bird, 15 cm long and weighing around 25 g. Its most distinctive feature is the olive-grey bill, which is disproportionately long and slightly hooked at the end. The plumage of the male is olive green on the crown, back, wings, tail and flanks, a grey belly, black throat and face, with a white submoustachial stripe and grey stripe above the eye. The legs are grey and the iris black. The female is similar but with a white throat and belly.

Behaviour

Breeding
The breeding season for this species is from August to November. The male builds a shallow cup nest of twigs and rootlets in a tree or other vegetation around 1.5 m off the ground. Two to three eggs are laid and incubated by both sexes.

Feeding
It forages singly or in pairs. It is a terrestrial bird that feeds on the ground on spiders, cockroaches, earwigs, true bugs, grasshoppers and ants. It rarely flies but instead walks and runs and probing its bill into leaf-litter, mosses, and soil.

Distribution and habitat
Crossley's vanga is endemic to Madagascar. It is distributed in the east of Madagascar in broadleaf forest, from sea level up to 1800 m.

References

 Collar, N. J. & Robson, C. 2007. Family Timaliidae (Babblers) pp. 70–291 in; del Hoyo, J., Elliott, A. & Christie, D.A. eds. Handbook of the Birds of the World, Vol. 12. Picathartes to Tits and Chickadees. Lynx Edicions, Barcelona.

External links
Image at ADW 

Crossley's vanga
Endemic birds of Madagascar
Crossley's vanga
Taxonomy articles created by Polbot